Aguas Claras Airport  is an airport serving Ocaña, a municipality of the Norte de Santander Department of Colombia.

Accidents and incidents
On 30 April 2003, Basler BT-67 PNC-0212 of the Servicio Aéreo de Policia was damaged beyond repair when it overran the runway at Aguas Claras Airport.

See also
Transport in Colombia
List of airports in Colombia

References

External links
OpenStreetMap - Ocaña
OurAirports - Ocaña
SkyVector - Ocaña
FallingRain - Aguas Claras Airport
 

Airports in Colombia
Buildings and structures in Norte de Santander Department
Ocaña, Norte de Santander